The 2021 D.C. United season was the club's 26th season of existence, and their 26th consecutive season playing in Major League Soccer, the top flight of American soccer. Due to the COVID-19 pandemic and its ongoing vaccination efforts, the season began on April 17, 2021 (about six weeks later than normal) and ended on November 7, 2021. Despite winning against Toronto FC on the last match of the regular season, the team did not qualify playoffs, making it their second consecutive season in which D.C. United did not qualify for the playoffs. It was the first time since 2011, that United did not qualify for the playoffs in consecutive seasons.

Beyond MLS play, D.C. United would have participated in the 2021 U.S. Open Cup, which was initially to begin on May 4, before again being delayed by about six weeks and then ultimately being canceled in July due to the COVID-19 pandemic.

Background

Offseason

The 2021 season was the first season since 2010 where Ben Olsen was not the club's head coach, as he was fired before the end of the 2020 season while Chad Ashton filled in as the interim head coach. After the 2020 season ended, the team began interviewing multiple candidates for the vacancy. Among the candidates included Ashton, former New York Red Bulls manager Chris Armas, former USWNT coach Jill Ellis, Columbus Crew assistant coach and former LA Galaxy assistant Ezra Hendrickson, and Seattle Sounders FC assistant coach Gonzalo Pineda. However, the team was either unable or unwilling to hire any of those candidates for undisclosed reasons. After a couple months of interviews and expanding the search to Europe, D.C. United officially announced the signing of former Argentine player and current head coach of Beerschot, Hernán Losada, on January 18, 2021.

On the player front, D.C. United declined options on six different players, letting their deals expire. The team also traded Ulises Segura to expansion side Austin FC for cash considerations. Meanwhile, the team signed D.C. United Academy and Loudoun United defender Jacob Greene to a Homegrown Contract. Later, the team picked up forward Adrien Perez from LAFC in the MLS Re-Entry Draft, and acquired Jon Kempin from Columbus to add depth to their goalkeeping corps in exchange for their third-round pick in the 2021 MLS SuperDraft. D.C. added a few more players during the offseason, signing both of their first-round picks in the SuperDraft (Kimarni Smith and Michael DeShields) to first-team deals and later adding Dutch forward Nigel Robertha. In addition, the team took in two players on loan: American defender Brendan Hines-Ike from KV Kortrijk in Belgium, and Venezuelan forward Jovanny Bolívar from Deportivo La Guaira.

With multiple players injured or recovering from injury during the preseason, D.C. signed two additional defenders just before the season-opening match: the veteran and former DCU Academy graduate Andy Najar, and Mexican defender Tony Alfaro, and put them both on the gameday roster.

MLS Season

With multiple prospective starters on the injury list or not match-fit to Losada's liking, Losada was forced to be creative with his opening day lineup. Among those decisions: Chris Seitz was given the start in goal, Alfaro started at CB despite being signed only a few days prior, and Erik Sorga was given the starting job as the main striker. DC fell behind early as their opponents, NYCFC, got the first goal 15 minutes into the match. Shortly after that, DC woke up and scored a pair of goals from outside the box, with Hines-Ike and Canouse each scoring a goal before the end of the first half. DC would end up winning their first match of the season 2-1. The match was also notable for giving Robertha and Perez their first minutes in a D.C. United jersey, along with Najar's return to the field for D.C. since leaving in 2013, as they were subbed in late into the match.

The following match against the New England Revolution used the same starting lineup, but it turned into a grinding affair with neither team really able to pull ahead. The only action was Hines-Ike accidentally deflecting a Revolution cross into his own net to give DC their first loss of the season, 1-0.

Management team

Roster

Transfers

In

Out

Loan in

Loan out

MLS SuperDraft picks

Non-competitive

Preseason

Midseason friendlies

Competitive

Major League Soccer

Standings

Eastern Conference

Overall table

Results summary

Results by round

Match results

U.S. Open Cup 

The U.S. Open Cup was canceled due to the COVID-19 pandemic for a second consecutive year.

Statistics

Appearances and goals

Numbers after plus–sign (+) denote appearances as a substitute.

Top scorers

Top assists

Disciplinary record

Awards
Awards will be announced as the season begins.

References

External links 
 D.C. United

 

2021
Dc United
Dc United
Dc United